Coniesta araealis is a moth in the family Crambidae. It was described by George Hampson in 1912. It is found in India.

References

Haimbachiini
Moths described in 1912